BCIC may refer to:

 Innovate BC, formerly known as the BC Innovation Council, a crown corporation in British Columbia, Canada, which promotes the province's tech industry
 Bangladesh Chemical Industries Corporation, a government owned corporation in Bangladesh